The National Women's Soccer League Save of the Week is a weekly soccer award given to individual players in the National Women's Soccer League since 2016. The honor is awarded by popular social media vote to the player deemed to have scored the best save over the past week.

Winners

2016

2017

2018

2019

2021

2022 Challenge Cup

2022 NWSL season

Multiple winners
The below table lists those who have won on more than one occasion as of September 15, 2022.

See also 

 List of sports awards honoring women
 NWSL awards
 NWSL records and statistics
 Women's soccer in the United States

References

2016

2017

2018

2019

2021

2022

Save of the Week
Awards established in 2016
Save of the Week
Lists of women's association football players
Association football player non-biographical articles